Branko "Brano" Miljuš is a Serbian politician and academic from Bosnia-Herzegovina.

Former high-ranking official of the Yugoslav Communist League' (SKJ) Bosnia-Herzegovina branch, he was most recently a member of Alliance of Independent Social Democrats (SNSD).

In early 1999, he became the Prime Minister elect of Republika Srpska, Serbian entity in Bosnia-Herzegovina.

References

Living people
League of Communists of Bosnia and Herzegovina politicians
Alliance of Independent Social Democrats politicians
Year of birth missing (living people)